Ana Fabrega (born 1991) is an American comedian. She is best known for her work as a writer, showrunner, and actor on the HBO series Los Espookys.

Early life and education 
Ana Fabrega was born in 1991 in Arizona, where she grew up in Scottsdale. Her parents had immigrated to the United States from Panama.

She studied economics and business at Fordham University in New York, and remained in the city after graduating.

Career 
After college, Fabrega worked in finance. She began doing comedy on the side, posting videos online and doing stand-up at open mics. She also garnered a following on Twitter.

She transitioned to working part-time, then quit her job and began working full-time in comedy, including as an actor on At Home with Amy Sedaris and as a writer on The Chris Gethard Show.

Fabrega was named a Just for Laughs New Face in 2017, and she was included on Vulture's list of Best New Up-and-coming Comedians to Watch in 2018.

In 2016, she had started occasionally working with the comedian Fred Armisen after having applied to work on his show Portlandia. When Armisen successfully pitched an idea for a new Spanish-language comedy series to HBO, he recruited Fabrega and fellow New York comedian Julio Torres to co-write and produce the show, Los Espookys. In addition to working as a writer and showrunner on Los Espookys, which Fabrega describes as "a show in an unnamed fictional Latin American country about a group of friends who make horror for people who need it," she plays the character Tati. The first season of Los Espookys aired in 2019. The show was renewed for a second season later that year. Filming was delayed due to the COVID-19 pandemic, but production on season 2 wrapped in early 2022.

In 2022, Fabrega appeared as Vanessa in the film Father of the Bride.

Personal life 
Fabrega is a self-described "queer, vegan democratic socialist."

Filmography

Television

Film

References

External links 

 
 Ana Fabrega on Twitter

1991 births
21st-century American comedians
American democratic socialists
American stand-up comedians
American women comedians
American television actresses
American women television writers
Comedians from Arizona
LGBT Hispanic and Latino American people
American LGBT comedians
Fordham University alumni
Living people
21st-century American actresses
21st-century LGBT people